Jason Smyth  (born 4 July 1987) is a Northern Irish sprint runner. He competes in the T13 disability sport classification as he is legally blind, with his central vision being affected by Stargardt's disease; he also competes in elite non-Paralympic competition. , Smyth holds T13 World records in the 100m and 200m events. 

He was selected to represent Northern Ireland at the 2014 Commonwealth Games. Deterioration in his vision meant that he was reassigned to the T12 classification in 2014, but he was subsequently reclassified back to T13 in 2015.

Career
He won two golds for Ireland at the 2008 Summer Paralympics setting records at the Men's 100 metres T13 and the Men's 200 metres T13, which led some Irish news sources to compare his feat to that of Usain Bolt, who achieved a similar feat at the 2008 Summer Olympics In 2015 the International Paralympic Committee's website also compared him to Bolt. Comparisons to Bolt have also been made by some non-Irish news sources such as CNN.

Smyth made history as the first Paralympian to compete at an open European championships, qualifying for the semi-finals of the 100 metres. Smyth ran 10.43 seconds, finishing 4th in his heat. He just missed out on the final by finishing 4th in semi-finals in a time of 10.47 seconds. Smyth was selected to represent Northern Ireland at the 2010 Commonwealth Games in Delhi, but had to withdraw from the team due to a back injury.

He won a bronze medal with the Irish relay team in the 4 × 100 m relay at the 2011 European Team Championships.

Smyth hoped to compete in both the Paralympics and the Olympics in 2012. Although he ran 10.22 for the 100m in May 2011, this was 0.04s short of the A time needed to secure a place in the Olympic games.

At the 2012 Summer Paralympics, Smyth won Heat 1 of the 100m final breaking the World Record in a time of 10.54 seconds before breaking the record again in the final where he defended his Paralympic title in a time of 10.46 seconds. This final was also marked as the fastest Paralympic 100 metres in history. Smyth equalled his Beijing achievement by winning gold in the Men's T13 200m with a world record time of 21.05 seconds.

At the 2016 Summer Paralympics, Smyth won Gold in the 100m final. The Irishman clocked 10.64 seconds as he finished 0.14 ahead of Namibia's Johannes Nambala.

At the 2020 Summer Paralympics, Smyth again won Gold in the 100m final. He clocked 10.53 seconds as he finished 0.01 ahead of Algeria's Skander Djamil Athmani.

In 2017 the International Paralympic Committee's website described him as "the world’s fastest Paralympian". In 2015 it had described him as "the fastest para-athlete of all time", while Britain's BBC described him as "the world's fastest ever Paralympian" in 2016.

Personal life
Jason is from Eglinton. He is a member of the Church of Jesus Christ of Latter-day Saints.

Smyth was appointed Member of the Order of the British Empire (MBE) in the 2022 New Year Honours for services to Paralympic athletics and the sporting community in Northern Ireland.

See also
 2012 Olympics gold post boxes in the United Kingdom

References

External links 
 
 

1987 births
Living people
Paralympic athletes of Ireland
Paralympic gold medalists for Ireland
Sportspeople from Derry (city)
Irish Mormon missionaries
People educated at Limavady Grammar School
Latter Day Saints from Northern Ireland
Athletes (track and field) at the 2008 Summer Paralympics
Athletes (track and field) at the 2012 Summer Paralympics
Athletes (track and field) at the 2016 Summer Paralympics
Athletes (track and field) at the 2020 Summer Paralympics
Visually impaired sprinters
World record holders in Paralympic athletics
Athletes (track and field) at the 2014 Commonwealth Games
Commonwealth Games competitors for Northern Ireland
Medalists at the 2008 Summer Paralympics
Medalists at the 2012 Summer Paralympics
Medalists at the 2016 Summer Paralympics
Medalists at the 2020 Summer Paralympics
Male sprinters from Northern Ireland
Paralympic medalists in athletics (track and field)
Members of the Order of the British Empire
Irish male sprinters
Paralympic sprinters